Kaigan-dori is a Hiroden station (tram stop) on Hiroden Ujina Line, located in Minami-ku, Hiroshima.

Routes
From Kaigan-dori Station, there are three of Hiroden streetcar routes.

  Hiroshima Station – Hiroshima Port Route
  Hiroden-nishi-hiroshima – Hiroshima Port Route
  Hiroshima Station – (via Hijiyama-shita) – Hiroshima Port Route

Connections
 █ Ujina Line
   
 Ujina 5-chōme – Kaigan-dori – Motoujina-guchi

Around station
 Hiroshima Keirin-jo
 Ujina gymnasium
 6th Regional Coast Guard Headquarters
 The Hiroshima Shinkin Bank Ujina
 DIO Ujina

History
 Opened as "Ujina" terminal on April 3, 1915.
 Changed the route and opened as "Ujina-sanbashi-mae" on December 27, 1935.
 Closed from June 1942 to November 30, 1950.
 Reopened as "Kaigan-dori" on December 1, 1950.
 Rebuilt "Kangan-dori" on August 31, 2002

See also
 Hiroden Streetcar Lines and Routes
 List of railway stations in Japan

Kaigan-dori Station
Railway stations in Japan opened in 1915